Maribel was a 1989 Venezuelan telenovela produced by Venevisión and distributed internationally by Venevisión International. A free version of telenovela La Zulianita produced in 1977,  Tatiana Capote and Luis José Santander starred as the main protagonists.

Plot
Maribel suffers a tragedy after her adoptive father dies, leaving the family penniless. she is forced to then look for a job. On her first job at a bar, the owner harasses her and during a fight, she accidentally wounds Jose Daniel who then files a suit against her. She manages to get a second job as a maid in the mansion of the Del Valle family where she meets and falls in love with Luis Alejandro, the eldest son of the family. Their love will be tested by trust, jealousy and secrets from the past. Maribel will be reunited with her father, Rogelio Duarte, a credible lawyer accused of a crime he did not commit by Luis Alejandro's parents, the ambitious Federico and Virginia Del Valle who were also responsible for separating Maribel's parents, Sofia and Rogelio.

Cast
Tatiana Capote as Maribel Duarte
Luis José Santander as Luis Alejandro Del Valle
Yolanda Mendez as Virginia Del Valle
Raúl Xiques as Federico Del Valle
Lilibeth Morillo as Andreina Colmenares
Jean Carlo Simancas as Rogelio Duarte
Veronica Ortiz
Rebeca Costoya as Erika
Henry Soto
Betty Ruth
Agustina Martin
Alberto Marin

References

External links
 

1989 telenovelas
Venevisión telenovelas
1989 Venezuelan television series debuts
Venezuelan telenovelas
1989 Venezuelan television series endings
Spanish-language telenovelas
Television shows set in Venezuela